Mestský štadión Žiar nad Hronom is a multi-use stadium in Žiar nad Hronom, Slovakia.  It is currently used mostly for football matches and is the home ground of Fortuna liga team FK Pohronie.  The stadium holds 2,309 people. In 1989 and 1999 it has hosted the final match of Slovak Cup.

Reconstruction
In 2016 began reconstruction of the stadium. Original capacity 12.910 was decreased to 2,309 spectators (all-seated). The estimated cost is €2 million. Slovak government provided €750,000 of the cost. City of Žiar nad Hronom provided €1,000,000 and other private sponsors like Nemak €250,000

Image gallery

References

Football venues in Slovakia